Pocket Full of Fire: Gangstagrass Live features tracks recorded in six venues across the United States by New York City based bluegrass rap group Gangstagrass during their Pocket Full of Fire tour in 2018.

In January 2019 Rolling Stone named “Keep Talking (Live)” as one of the "10 Best Country and Americana Songs to Hear Now".

Track listing

Personnel 
 Rench (Oscar Owens): vocals/guitar/beats
 Dolio The Sleuth (Durant Lawrence): vocals
 R-Son The Voice of Reason (Randy Green): vocals
 Dan Whitener: vocals/banjo
 Landry McMeans: vocals/dobro

References

External links 
 Gangstagrass official homepage

Behind the Scenes
 Gangstagrass - behind the scenes on the Pocket Full Of Fire tour: Indianapolis
 Gangstagrass - behind the scenes on the Pocket Full Of Fire tour: St Louis

Live Recordings
 Live recording of album track: 1. Barnburning (live)
 Live recording of album track: 2. Keep Talking (Live)
 Live recording of album track: 3. You Can Never Go Home Again (live)
 Live recording of album track: 7. Gunslinging Rambler (live)
 Live recording of album track: 8. Bound To Ride (live)
 Live recording of album track: 11. Will The Circle Be Unbroken (live)

Gangstagrass albums
2019 live albums